For other places with the same name, see Ramgarh

Ramgarh is a small hill station and tourist destination on the way to Mukteshwar in Nainital district of Uttarakhand, India. This place is rich in orchards. An unobstructed view of the snow-capped ranges of the Himalayas from this place can be seen. The place was once the cantonment of the English army. The famous poets Rabindra Nath Tagore and social worker Narain Swami had established their ashrams over here.
The writers Ramdhari Singh 'Dinkar' and Sachchidananda Hirananda Vatsyayan, famous by his pen-name "Agyeya" also lived here. There is also a library dedicated to famous Hindi poet writer Mahadevi Varma, who got the idea of writing Lachma, the famous story, in Ramgarh.

Geography
Ramgarh is divided into parts- Talla (lower part) and the Malla (Upper part). It has an average elevation of 1,518 metres (4,980 feet). The altitude ranges from 1,400 metres in the Talla (Lower) Ramgarh valley to 1,900 metres in Malla (Upper) Ramgarh. The East-West ridge above Malla Ramgarh has an elevation of 2000–2350 metres.

Economy

Tourism
Ramgarh, which is located near Mukteshwar, is visited and known by a few people. 

Ramgarh is also known as the "Fruit Bowl of Kumaon" owing to its verdant orchards of peach, apricots, pears, and apples. It comprises two parts - Malla, located on a high elevation, and Talla, located downhill. It also has a famous viewing spot called Dadi Point.

Nearby locations include  Gagar Shiv temple, Tagore Top, Madhuban, Sri Aurobindo Ashram, Hartola, Mukteshwar and Nathuakhan, all accessible from Nainital and Bhimtal.

References

Tourism in Uttarakhand
Nainital
Cities and towns in Nainital district